Power Chan Kwok-pong is an actor in Hong Kong. He has appeared in numerous TVB drama series as well as films. He dated cantopop singer and actress Mimi Lo for 7 years before marrying her on December 2, 2009. He left TVB in October 2015.

Filmography

Film

TV series

References

Living people
1968 births
TVB veteran actors
Alumni of The Hong Kong Academy for Performing Arts
21st-century Hong Kong male actors
Hong Kong male film actors
Hong Kong male television actors
20th-century Hong Kong male actors